Old Boys of Saint-Loup (French:  Les anciens de Saint-Loup) is a 1950 French drama film directed by Georges Lampin and starring François Périer, Bernard Blier and Serge Reggiani. After attending a fundraising reunion at their old boarding school in the countryside, the murder of a young woman leads to an investigation.

The film's sets were designed by the art director Robert Clavel. It was shot at the Billancourt Studios in Paris.

Cast
 François Périer as Charles Merlin 
 Bernard Blier as Jean Laclaux 
 Serge Reggiani as L'abbé Paul Forestier 
 Odile Versois as Catherine Jacquelin 
 Charles Vissières as Le portier 
 Gabriel Gobinas Subileau 
 Raphaël Patorni as Fourcade 
 Maurice Régamey as Raboisson 
 Pierre Mondy as Puy-Tirejol 
 Johnny Chambot as Émile 
 Pamela Wilde as Barbara 
 Michel André as Caille 
 Jean Sylvère as Abadie 
 René Berthier as Lahulotte 
 Serge Grave as Le Guellec 
 Jacques Denoël as Espérandieu 
 Robert Pouget as Maréchal 
 Monique Mélinand as Hélène Laclaux 
 Pierre Larquey as M. Jacquelin, directeur du collège

References

Bibliography 
 Dayna Oscherwitz & MaryEllen Higgins. The A to Z of French Cinema. Scarecrow Press, 2009.

External links 
 

1950 films
1950 drama films
French drama films
1950s French-language films
Films based on works by Pierre Véry
Films directed by Georges Lampin
French black-and-white films
Films shot at Billancourt Studios
1950s French films